Calocera is a fungal genus in the Dacrymycetes order. It is widely distributed and contains 15 species.

Etymology
Calocera is derived from the Greek words kalós, "beautiful", and kéras, "horn". In English it is called stagshorn, which also describes its similarity with the horn of an animal.

Species
Calocera australis
Calocera bambusicola
Calocera clavata
Calocera cornea
Calocera furcata
Calocera fusca
Calocera glossoides
Calocera guepinioides
Calocera lutea
Calocera pallidospathulata
Calocera sinensis
Calocera viscosa

References

Dacrymycetes